Zoo Detective is a television program created for the San Diego Zoo Kid's Network. It features trivia questions about animals with a sleuthing theme. Intended audience is ages 4 to 10.

American children's animated mystery television series
San Diego Zoo
Television series about cattle
Animated television series about mammals